Park Seh-jik (18 September 1933 – 27 July 2009) was a South Korean politician, bureaucrat and army general. He held many powerful positions throughout his lifetime, such as the Mayor of Seoul and the Director of Agency for National Security Planning (ANSP), a preceding agency of the National Intelligence Service (NIS). He was President of the Seoul Organizing Committee for the 1986 Asian Games and 1988 Summer Olympics in Seoul. 

He died of acute pneumonia on 27 July 2009.

Early life
Park Seh-jik was born on September 18, 1933 in Shikkoku, Keishōhoku-dō, at the time a part of the Japanese Empire.

Education
Park graduated from the Busan National University of Education. When the Korean War broke out, he enlisted as a soldier and eventually entered the Korea Military Academy, graduating in 1956 with the 12th class. While serving in the military, he received his master's degree from the Graduate School of English Language and Literature at Seoul National University.

Park eventually went on to receive a doctorate in education from the University of Southern California.

Non-degree completion
Seoul National University Graduate School of Public Administration 8
Graduated from Seoul National University Graduate School of Business 11

Honorary doctorate
US Columbia University Honors Philosophy Dr.
Doctor of Honor Humanities Science, Tarson University, Maryland State, USA
Honorary Doctorate in Humanities at Christ Baptist University in Dallas, Texas, USA
Honorary Doctorate of Humanities at Aiken University, USA
Doctor of Honorary Education, Daegu University
Daejeon University honorary Military Science doctorate degree

Career

Seoul Olympics
On May 7, 1986, Park was appointed and nominated as President of the Seoul Olympic Organizing Committee to replace Roh Tae-woo before stepping down.

Mayor

Park was appointed as Mayor of Seoul on December 27, 1990, succeeding Goh Kun. He held the office for 54 days before being succeeded by Lee Haewon on February 18, 1991.

Personal life
Park was married to Hong Suk-ja. He had three children.

Death
Park died on July 27, 2009 at the age of 75 due to acute pneumonia. He was survived by his wife, Hong Suk-ja, his two sons, and daughter.

References

External links
Park Seh-jik at rokps.or.kr 

Members of the National Assembly (South Korea)
Government ministers of South Korea
South Korean generals
Presidents of the Organising Committees for the Olympic Games
1933 births
2009 deaths
Mayors of Seoul
People from Gumi, North Gyeongsang
Recipients of the Olympic Order
Directors of the Agency for National Security Planning
Korea Military Academy alumni
20th-century South Korean politicians